A domino computer is a mechanical computer built using dominoes  to represent mechanical amplification or logic gating of digital signals.

Basic phenomenon 
Sequences of standing dominoes (so that each domino topples the next one) can be arranged to demonstrate digital concepts such as amplification and digital signals. Since digital information is conducted by a string of dominoes, this effect differs from phenomena where:
 energy is conducted without amplification, thus dissipating; or
 amplification is applied to non-digital signals, allowing noise effects to occur.

The Domino Day event shows many constructs, mainly for the purposes of entertainment. Some constructs may remind people of digital circuits, suggesting that not only telegraph-like tools can be shown, but also simple information processing modules can be constructed.

It is possible to use this phenomenon for constructing unconventional computing tools. The base phenomenon is sufficient to achieve this goal, but also sophisticated “mechanical synapses” can be used (see online ), to the analogy of electrical synapses or chemical synapses.

Logical aspects

The logic gate OR is very natural in dominoes.
The problem is which gate is able to be added to OR, and obtain a functionally complete set.
Note that no domino gate can produce output 1 with all inputs 0,
so there is no NOT gate, making it impossible to make an IMPLY gate without an external 'power source' sequence.
Once we admit it, NOT is realized and we have a complete set.

But it is however distant to lead in a sequence from one source to many gates in each suitable timing.
Let us suppose we do not have one.

A root breaking system is basically needed if one wants a logical connective with output 0 for input 1.
Let P$Q be the gate in which the sequence to be turned down by P is broken by that by Q.
Then P$Q is logically equivalent to P AND (NOT Q), if the input Q is earlier than P.
The set of OR and $ can represent any logical connectives in any parity except for ones which generates 1 with all inputs 0.

Similarly, an XOR gate can be realized with the gate as a bi-root breaking system.

The problems of these two  root breaking systems is that they heavily depend on the simultaneity of two inputs.
In the gate of XOR one input may destroy the opposite input root tracking back.
Note that the expression of P AND Q, P$(P$Q) OR Q$(Q$P) is symmetric,
hence does not depend on the simultaneity, and with no worry of tracking back, though it is complicated.

Record

The current record for biggest domino computer is a 5-bit adder.

At the Manchester Science Festival in 2012, mathematician Matt Parker and a team of volunteers worked together to build a domino binary adder which could add two three-bit inputs and produce a 3-bit output, which ran successfully. The following day, they attempted to build a 4-bit adder, which they completed, but the final test run had some errors (one due to signal bleed between chains of dominoes, and one timing issue).

In 2018, at Bank Muscat headquarters in Oman, a team of American British Academy (ABA) Grade 12 students led by Saatvik Suryajit Korisepati, assisted by Alex Freyer, Zoltan Sojitory, and other computer students, used 15,000 dominoes to build a 5-bit adder able to add any numbers up to the sum of 63.

See also 

 Domino logic
 The concept is mentioned in the book I Am a Strange Loop by Douglas Hofstadter.

Notes

External links
 

Classes of computers
Computer
Mechanical computers